Mirosława Krajewska (born 11 September 1940) is a Polish actress. She starred in the 1976 film Brunet wieczorową porą.

External links

 Link to Filmus.Pl page on Miroslawa Krajewska, listing several other films starring this actress.

1940 births
Living people
Polish film actresses
Actresses from Warsaw
20th-century Polish actresses
21st-century Polish actresses